Solo Leveling, also alternatively translated as Only I Level Up, is a South Korean web novel written by Chugong. It was serialized in Kakao's digital comic and fiction platform KakaoPage beginning on July 25, 2016, and was later published in full by D&C Media under their Papyrus label on November 4, 2016.

A webtoon adaptation of Solo Leveling was first serialized in KakaoPage on March 4, 2018; it was illustrated by Jang Sung-Rak (aka Dubu), the CEO of Redice Studio, who died on July 23, 2022, after suffering from a cerebral hemorrhage. The webtoon's first season concluded on March 19, 2020, and its second season began on August 1, 2020, concluding in December 2021 with its 179th chapter. Its individual chapters have been collected and published by D&C Media into five volumes as of September 20, 2022. The novel has been licensed in English by Yen Press.

A role-playing video game is in development at Netmarble. An anime television series adaptation by A-1 Pictures is set to premiere in 2023.

Plot
In a world where hunters — human warriors who possess supernatural abilities — must battle deadly monsters to protect mankind from certain annihilation, a notoriously weak hunter named Sung Jinwoo finds himself in a seemingly endless struggle for survival. One day, after narrowly surviving an overwhelmingly powerful double dungeon that nearly wipes out his entire party, a mysterious program called the System chooses him as its sole player and in turn, gives him the extremely rare ability to level up in strength and turn anyone he kills into a loyal minion called a shadow. Jinwoo then sets out on a journey as he fights against all kinds of enemies, both man and monster, to discover the secrets of the dungeons and the true source of his powers.

Characters
Sung Jin-woo

Sung Jin-woo is the main protagonist of series. Originally an infamous weak E-Rank hunter, he gets the chance of a lifetime when he is selected as the Player of a magical program called the System and gains the unique ability to grow in strength without limit. By taking advantage of this new power offered to him by the System, Jinwoo eventually rises up to become humanity's greatest hunter, but also eventually finds himself to be a major player in a war that has been going on forever between the Rulers and the Monarchs, two groups of unbelievably powerful humanoids who have their own agendas with mankind.

Yoo Jin-ho

Yoo Jin-ho is a Korean D-Rank Hunter and Jinwoo's best friend. He comes from a very wealthy family and eventually becomes the vice chairman of Jinwoo's guild after he impresses the latter with his sense of loyalty and commitment. Jinho also shares a brother-like relationship with Jinwoo, due to the fact that he is estranged from his real biological brother, and tends to dress up in very fancy and expensive armor that he usually buys from foreign manufacturers, which serves as a prominent running gag throughout the series.

Sung Jin-ah

Sung Jinah is Jinwoo's younger sister. Unlike her brother, she is still a high school student and not a hunter.

Park Kyung-hye

Park Kyung-hye is Jinwoo and Jinah's mother. Four years before the events of the main storyline, she suddenly became ill with Eternal Slumber, an incurable and magically induced sleeping disorder, and fell into a coma soon after, forcing Jinwoo to take over as the breadwinner of the family in her place. However, about four years later, Jinwoo was able to cure her condition and wake her up by using a rare potion he crafted while training with the System.

Lee Joo-hee

Lee Joohee is a Korean B-Rank hunter who specializes in healing magic and one of Jinwoo's old friends during his days as an E-Rank Hunter. Although she survives the double dungeon alongside Jinwoo, she is left shell-shocked by the experience and ultimately retires after failing to overcome the mental trauma she suffered from the incident.

Cha Hae-in

Cha Hae-In is a Korean S-Rank Hunter who specializes in swordsmanship and the only female S-Rank in the country. She has a rare condition that causes other hunters to smell foul to her and eventually develops romantic feelings for Jinwoo after witnessing him in action and discovering that he is the only hunter she has ever met who actually smells nice to her.

Sung Il-hwan

Sung Il-Hwan was a Korean S-Rank Hunter, Kyung-Hye's husband, and Jinwoo and Jinah's father. Ten years before the events of the main storyline, he suddenly disappeared inside a dungeon while on a raid, leaving his family to presume him dead. However, about a decade later, he returned to the human world to aid his son in the coming war against the Monarchs and was eventually revealed to be a Rulers' vessel, one of the seven humans chosen by the Rulers to serve them as their hosts. Although Il-Hwan ultimately succeeded in his mission, he ended up exerting far more power than his body could handle in his last battle with the Monarchs and consequently died afterwards in his son's arms, with Jinwoo unable to do anything to save him.

Go Gun-hee

Go Gunhee was a Korean S-Rank Hunter and the Chairman of the Korean Hunters' Association, the government agency responsible for overseeing all the hunters, gates, and guilds active within Korea. Although he was later revealed to be a Rulers' vessel, he suffered from a variety of health problems due to his old age, preventing him from using his powers to their maximum output, and was ultimately killed by the Monarchs in battle.

Thomas Andre

Thomas Andre is one of the strongest hunters in America and one of the five National Level Hunters, ranking 1st in the world. He is also a Rulers' vessel and is nicknamed the Goliath due to his large build and immense superhuman strength. He later befriends Jinwoo after the latter defeats him in a fight and give him Kamish's Wrath, the strongest magical weapon in the world, as a gift.

Liu Zhigang

Liu Zhigang is the strongest hunter in China and one of the five National Level Hunters, ranking 2nd in the world. He is also a Rulers' vessel and was the strongest hunter in Asia until Jinwoo surpassed him in power. He later becomes on good terms with Jinwoo when they meet each other for the first time during the annual guild conference.

Christopher Reed

Christopher Reed was one of the strongest hunters in America and one of the five National Level Hunters, ranking 3rd in the world. He was also a Rulers' vessel and the first of the seven to be killed by the Monarchs.

Siddharth Bachchan

Siddharth Bachchan is the strongest hunter in India and one of the five National Level Hunters, ranking 4th in the world. He is also a Rulers' vessel and the only one of the seven to never make a physical appearance in the webtoon.

Ryuji Goto

Ryuji Goto was the strongest hunter in Japan. Despite the fact that he was small fry compared to the National Level Hunters, Goto was very egotistical and had a callous disregard for human life. His hubris ultimately cost him his life when he was later killed in one hit by a powerful ant monster called the Ant King during a raid on the Jeju Island S-Rank Gate.

Hwang Dong-soo

Hwang Dongsoo was a Korean S-Rank Hunter based in America who attempted to kill Jinwoo after learning that the latter was responsible for the death of his older brother. He was eventually killed by Jinwoo himself after making the mistake of abducting and brutally torturing Jinho for information on the circumstances of his brother's murder. Following his death, he became one of Jinwoo's shadow soldiers.

Lennart Niermann

Lennart Niermann is the strongest hunter in Germany, ranking 12th in the world. Despite being the best in his homeland, Lennart is not particularly arrogant and has a strong sense of duty towards the cause, as displayed when he was willing to use himself as bait to save Thomas from getting killed by the Monarchs.

Ashborn

Ashborn is the King of the Dead and the Monarch of Shadows. He is also the strongest Ruler and the Greatest Fragment of Brilliant Light. After spending eons fighting in the ancient war between the Rulers and the Monarchs, Ashborn grew weary of the ceaseless violence, leading him to eventually chose Jinwoo as his host in hopes of ending the bloodshed once and for all. When Jinwoo is later killed by the Monarchs, Ashborn appears in the flesh to save him and gives Jinwoo a detailed explanation of his past. After transferring the rest of his powers to Jinwoo and bringing him back to life, Ashborn goes into eternal sleep and allows Jinwoo to take his place as the Shadow Monarch.

Antares

Antares was the King of Dragons and the Monarch of Destruction. He was also the strongest Monarch and the final antagonist of Solo Leveling. After Jinwoo killed three of the other Monarchs, Antares invaded the human world in order to draw him out and finish him off. However, despite his best efforts, he ultimately failed to achieve his ambitions and was killed by the Rulers.

Rulers

The Rulers, also called the Fragments of Brilliant Light, are an ancient race of winged humanoids who aim to protect the human race from being annihilated by the Monarchs. Although they have noble ambitions, they are willing to use morally questionable methods to achieve them and are indirectly responsible for the millions of human lives lost ever since monsters first began using gates to cross over to the human world. The Rulers also heavily resemble angels in appearance and are able to use a form of telekinesis unique to themselves called Ruler's Authority.

Monarchs

The Monarchs are an ancient race of monsters who seek to wipe out the human race for their own ends, making them the primary antagonists of the series. As a result, they have a cruel disregard for life and are generally very arrogant towards those they find inferior to themselves, especially humans. The Monarchs also each govern a different race of monsters and take after the race that they rule over in appearance.

Media

Web novel
Solo Leveling was first serialized in Kakao's digital comic and fiction platform KakaoPage since July 25, 2016, and later published by D&C Media under their fantasy fiction label "Papyrus". Since 2016, the novel has garnered 2.4 million readers in KakaoPage. The novel was licensed in English by Webnovel under the title Only I Level Up from December 21, 2018, to June 24, 2019.

The novel has been licensed and published in collected volumes by Yen Press since February 16, 2021.

Volume list

Webtoon
A webtoon adaptation launched in KakaoPage on March 4, 2018, and concluded its first season on March 19, 2020. Its first collected volume was released by D&C Media on September 26, 2019. In Japan, Solo Leveling launched in Kakao Japan's webtoon and fiction service Piccoma, and accumulated over 1 million cumulative readership. It was also selected as the No. 1 webtoon in Piccoma's "Best of 2019". The webtoon has been published digitally in English by Webnovel and Tappytoon since May 7 and June 4, 2020, respectively. It is also published on Tapas in English. The collected volumes have been licensed and published in North America by Yen Press since March 2, 2021.

Volume list

Game
In January 2022, Netmarble announced that they are developing a role-playing video game based on the series.

Anime
An anime television series adaptation was announced at Anime Expo 2022. It will be produced by A-1 Pictures and directed by Shunsuke Nakashige, with Noboru Kimura writing the scripts, Tomoko Sudo designing the characters, and Hiroyuki Sawano composing the music. It is set to premiere in 2023. Crunchyroll licensed the series outside of Asia.

References

External links
 Official novel website in KakaoPage 
 Official webtoon website in KakaoPage 
 Official anime website 
 

2018 webtoon debuts
2023 anime television series debuts
21st-century South Korean novels
A-1 Pictures
Action webtoons
Anime based on manhwa
Anime composed by Hiroyuki Sawano
Aniplex
Crunchyroll anime
Fantasy webtoons
Manhwa titles
South Korean webtoons
Tapastic webcomics
Television shows based on South Korean webtoons
Upcoming anime television series
Webtoons in print
Webtoons
Yen Press titles